The 2009–10 season was 85th season in the existence of Rotherham United F.C., a football club based in Rotherham, South Yorkshire, England. The club participated in League Two, the FA Cup, the League Cup and the Football League Trophy.

Season summary 
On 9 September 2009, manager Mark Robins left Rotherham to manage local rivals Barnsley. Later that month, Ronnie Moore was appointed as his replacement.

First-team squad 
Players' ages are as of 1 August 2009.

Competitions

League Two

League table

Play-offs

FA Cup

Football League Cup

Football League Trophy

Player statistics

Appearances and goals

References 

Rotherham United F.C. seasons
Rotherham United